Maiestas dispar (formerly Recilia dispar) is a species of leafhopper from the Cicadellidae family that is endemic to Liberia. It was formerly placed within Recilia, but a 2009 revision moved it to Maiestas.

References

External links

Insects described in 1962
Endemic fauna of Liberia
Insects of West Africa
Maiestas